Times Fly is an EP by Orbital in 1995. The EP was too long in duration to qualify for the UK Singles Chart but its dealer price was too low to qualify for the UK Album Chart.

The EP features four tracks and the 12" version covers two pieces of vinyl with a track over each side. There are two versions of the title track, "Times Fly (Slow)" a down tempo track and "Times Fly (Fast)" with a more drum and bass feel. The EP also features "Sad But New", an alternate version of "Sad But True" from the Snivilisation album which features vocals from Alison Goldfrapp. "Sad But New" samples then-current Prime Minister John Major discussing New Age travellers. In its original broadcast on BBC Radio 1 via ISDN, "Sad But True" featured extensive samples from John Major edited together into a protest message.

Track listing

 A. "Times Fly (Slow)" (7:58)
 B. "Sad But New"  (7:29)
 C. "Times Fly (Fast)" (7:53)
 D. "The Tranquilizer" (6:27)

Artwork

The sleeve was designed by Grant Fulton (Fultano Absenti 95) and Pete Mauder (Mauder) with photography by John Ross. The design features cogs wheels that could be inside a clock, watch or other contraption.

References

External links
 Orbital - Times Fly EP at Discogs.com

1995 EPs
Techno EPs
Electronic EPs
Orbital (band) EPs